Dipterocarpus crinitus (Indonesian: tampurau) is a species of plant in the family Dipterocarpaceae. The species name is derived from Latin (crinitus = having tufts of long weak hair) and refers to golden-brown bristle-like hairs that cover the plant parts. It is an emergent tree, up to 60 m tall, in mixed dipterocarp forest on sandy clay soils. It is a medium hardwood sold under the trade names of  Keruing. It is found in Peninsular Thailand, Sumatra, Peninsular Malaysia and Borneo.

References

Endangered plants
crinitus
Trees of Thailand
Trees of Sumatra
Trees of Peninsular Malaysia
Trees of Borneo
Flora of Sabah